Dmytro Ihorovych Drozdovskyi (Ukrainian: Дмитро́ І́горович Дроздо́вський, born 18 February 1987, Odesa, Ukrainian SSR) is a Ukrainian scientist, literary critic, writer, editor, and translator. Since 2012, he has been working as managing editor-in-chief of the Ukrainian magazine of translations "Vsesvit". He is a PhD academic fellow of the Department of world literature of the Shevchenko Institute of Literature of the National Academy of Sciences of Ukraine. Drozdovskyi is a member of the Supreme Council of the Writer's Union of Ukraine. In 2013, he has competed his PhD dissertation "Reception of William Shakespeare in Ukrainian emigration literature process of 1940-1960-s". Drozdovskyi is a scholar whose academic goals are in the field of contemporary English and British literature, European studies, Shakespearean studies and cultural explanations of post-postmodernism which combines modern and postmodern aesthetics.

He was a participant of the XIX and XX-th Congresses of the International Association of Comparative Literature (Seoul 2010; Paris 2013) and the International Shakespearean Congress. Drozdovskyi also investigated the historical method of Mykhailo Hrushevskyi.

Drozdovskyi is a pro-European and pro-US thinker and critic in Ukraine. He was one of the first to struggle against Kivalov-Kolesnichenko anti-Ukrainian language law and he was in opposition to ex-Minister of Education and Science of Ukraine D. Tabachnyk regime.

Some of Drozdovskyi's poems were translated into French and published in anthologies.

Together with Rory Finnin he initiated the annual Cambridge Vsesvit Readings at the University of Cambridge.

Education
Drozdovskyi belongs to alumni of the National University of Kyiv-Mohyla Academy. He finished his Master program of Arts and Humanities in 2010 (specialty Theory, history of literature and comparative studies). He has been working for 5 years as a press-secretary of the NaUKMA.

Works
Code of the Future (Kyiv, 2006, supervisor of the book is Prof. Oxana Pachlovska)
Meridian of Understanding (Kyiv, 2011)
Between Demonic and Historiosophic: William Shakespeare in Modern and Post-Postmodern Outlines (Kyiv, 2014)

Articles
Postmodern Literature: Ruined Aesthetics or New Frontiers? // Journal of Literature and Art Studies. — Vol. 1. Number 2. — August 2011. — Р. 132–143.
The Life after the End: Dialogues with the Classics // The International Journal of the Humanities. — Vol.8, Number 12. — 2011. — P. 111–120.

References 

1987 births
Living people
Writers from Odesa
Ukrainian male writers
Ukrainian literary critics
Recipients of the Honorary Diploma of the Cabinet of Ministers of Ukraine